Drew Adams (born August 19, 1986 in Springfield, Pennsylvania) is a former professional lacrosse player who played for the Archers Lacrosse Club of the Premier Lacrosse League and the Long Island/New York Lizards of Major League Lacrosse. Adams played collegiately at Penn State University, where he was named an All American three times. Adams ranks first in PSU history with 694 career saves.

Adams has enjoyed a successful career in Major League Lacrosse, winning his first championship in 2015. He has been an MLL All- Star 4 times, and has been named the leagues Goalie of the Year following the 2011, 2012, and 2015 seasons.

On the International level, Adams is a current member of Team USA, winning a silver medal in the 2014 World Games.

Adams announced his retirement following the 2021 PLL season, finishing his career as the all-time leader in saves in professional outdoor lacrosse.

See also
Lacrosse in Pennsylvania
Mader with how to train your dragon 3

References

Living people
Major League Lacrosse players
Lacrosse players from Pennsylvania
Penn State Nittany Lions men's lacrosse players
Premier Lacrosse League players
1986 births
American lacrosse players